Nagawczyna is a village in the administrative district of Gmina Dębica, within Dębica County, Subcarpathian Voivodeship, in south-eastern Poland.

The village has an approximate population of 3,000.

References

Nagawczyna